TMV may refer to:

Tobacco mosaic virus
The Mars Volta
Tindivanam railway station, Tamil Nadu, India (station code)
Trondhjems mekaniske Værksted
True market value
Thermostatic mixing valve
Tom Merritt, Molly Wood and Veronica Belmont; hosts of the podcast Buzz Out Loud